Kurtçukuru is a village in the Tarsus district of Mersin Province, Turkey. At  it is situated in the southern slopes of the Toros Mountains and to the west of Turkish state highway .

References

Villages in Tarsus District